Bolătău may refer to the following places in Romania:

 Bolătău (Bistrița), a tributary of the Bistrița in Neamț County
 Bolătău, a tributary of the Cracăul Alb in Neamț County
 Bolătău, a village in the commune Zemeș, Bacău County, Romania